The 2003 IFMAR 1:10 Electric Off-Road World Championships was the tenth edition of the IFMAR 1:10 Electric Off-Road World Championship was held in Largo in the United States.

2WD Results

4WD Results

References

IFMAR 1:10 Electric Off-Road World Championship